In mathematics, Witt equivalence is either of two concepts in the theory of quadratic spaces:

 For fields: having isomorphic Witt rings
 For quadratic forms: having isomorphic core forms in a Witt decomposition